Scopula bispurcata is a moth of the family Geometridae. It was described by Warren in 1898. It is found in India (Assam).

References

Moths described in 1898
Moths of Asia
bispurcata
Taxa named by William Warren (entomologist)